is a Japanese cross-country skier. She competed in the women's 15 kilometre classical at the 1998 Winter Olympics.

References

External links
 

1971 births
Living people
Japanese female cross-country skiers
Olympic cross-country skiers of Japan
Cross-country skiers at the 1998 Winter Olympics
Sportspeople from Nagano Prefecture